Julia Ludwika Michalska-Płotkowiak (born 21 July 1985 in Kozienice) is a Polish rower.

At the 2008 Summer Olympics, she rowed in the women's single sculls, reaching the final but finishing in 8th place.  At the 2012 Summer Olympics, she and teammate Magdalena Fularczyk competed in the women's double sculls, winning the bronze medal.

References 
 
 

1985 births
Living people
Polish female rowers
Olympic rowers of Poland
Rowers at the 2008 Summer Olympics
Rowers at the 2012 Summer Olympics
People from Kozienice
Olympic bronze medalists for Poland
Olympic medalists in rowing
Medalists at the 2012 Summer Olympics
Sportspeople from Masovian Voivodeship
World Rowing Championships medalists for Poland
European Rowing Championships medalists